Ndaizivei Madzikangava is a Zimbabwean netball player who represents Zimbabwe internationally and plays in the positions of wing attack and wing defense. She was a member of the Zimbabwean squad during the 2019 Netball World Cup, which was historically Zimbabwe's first ever appearance at a Netball World Cup tournament.

References 

Living people
Zimbabwean netball players
Year of birth missing (living people)
2019 Netball World Cup players
20th-century Zimbabwean women
21st-century Zimbabwean women